Raydiation is the third studio album by American recording artist Ray J. It was released by Sanctuary Records in association with the singer's own label, Knockout Entertainment, on September 20, 2005, in the United States. Ray J's first effort in four years, the album was primarily produced by Detail, featuring additional production from Rodney "Darkchild" Jerkins, R. Kelly, Ric Rude, and Timbaland. Rapper Fat Joe, singer Mýa and Ray J's sister, singer Brandy, appear a guest vocalist on the album.

Critical reception 

Allmusic editor Andy Kellman found that Raydiation "isn't any less derivative than Everything You Want and This Ain't a Game. He's still putting on airs, rarely deviating from copping his moves off R. Kelly and Usher. There's really nothing worth singling out [...] If Ray J plans on maintaining his every-four-years release schedule, he might as well spend less time soaking up his influences and more time developing some individuality."

Chart performance
In the United States, Raydiation entered the Billboard 200 at number 48, selling 21,517 copies in its first week of release. In addition, it peaked at number 13 on the Top R&B/Hip-Hop Albums chart. Billboard ranked the album 85th on its Top R&B/Hip-Hop Albums year end listing.

Singles
"One Wish" was chosen as the first single over "Keep Sweatin" and "Quit Actin". The Jerkins-produced track became a US national hit, peaking at number 11 on Billboards Hot 100 on January 17, 2006. It became Ray-J's first single to reach the Top 20 and was followed by "What I Need" and "Lets Play House".

Track listing

Notes
  denotes vocal producer

Personnel
Credits are taken from the album's liner notes.

Instruments and performances

Ray J – vocals (1–13), lead vocals (14–15)
Brandy – vocals (8), background vocals (14)
Rudy Currence – vocal arrangements (5)
Fat Joe – rap vocals (2)
Noel "Detail" Fisher – rap vocals (11)
Gangsta Girl – rap vocals (11)
R. Kelly – vocals (9)

Donnie Lyle – guitar (9)
Cornelius "Corny" Mims – bass (6, 8, 13)
Mýa – vocals (12)
Isaac Phillips – guitar (7)
Shorty Mack – rap vocals (9, 11), background vocals (15)
Tim Stuart – guitar (2, 4)
Michael Teixeira – guitar (1, 6, 8, 10)

Charts

Weekly charts

Year-end charts

Release history

References

2005 albums
Albums produced by Detail (record producer)
Albums produced by Rodney Jerkins
Albums produced by R. Kelly
Knockout Entertainment albums
Albums produced by Timbaland
Ray J albums